Natula averni is one of the smallest and most elusive species of cricket living in the Mediterranean Basin.

Distribution and habitat
The species was found in several coastal regions of Italy, mostly on the Thyrrhenian coast, as well as in Sardinia and Sicily. N. averni was also found in Corsica, in the Balearic Islands, in the Canary Islands and in Turkey.

The taxonomic status of this species is still controversial. Even though currently its range is considered to include southern Europe and Turkey, it may be synonymous with Natula longipennis, in which case its range would include Africa and Asia. Furthermore, it could be a species complex, consisting of more species even in southern Europe.

Description
The overall color is yellowish. Forewings cover entirely the abdomen, hind wings are much longer.

The song is a harmonious trill that can be heard from April to the late summer, and is disproportionately strong for a cricket just a few millimeters long: the position of the singing animal is very difficult to locate.

Biology
The biology of this species is poorly known.
Its tiny size and its color make it almost impossible to catch, but it can be attracted to light or found in pitfall traps. 

Its elusiveness is the reason why this species is most probably underrecorded, and may prove less rare and more widespread than expected.

Gallery

References

Bibliography
 Brizio C., 2018. Biodiversity Journal, 2018, 9 (2): 135–142 >> Bioacoustic evidence of two uncommon crickets from SW Sardinia, including an analysis of the song of B. megacephalus  in the ultrasonic range
 Gorochov A.V. & Llorente V., 2001. Graellsia, 57 (2): 95-139 >>  Estudio taxonómico preliminar de los Grylloidea de España (Insecta, Orthoptera)
 Odé B., Kleukers R., Forbicioni L., Mass a B., Roesti C., Boitier E. & Braud Y., 2011. Articulata, 26 (1): 51-65 >> In search of the most mysterious orthopteran of Europe: the Reed cricket Natula averni (Orthoptera: Gryllidae)
 Surdo S., sicil., S. IV, XLIII (2), 2019, pp. 253-257 >> SICILIAN NATURALISTIC NEWS - Natula averni (Orthoptera, Gryllidae) 2nd
and the 3rd record in Sicily

External links

 Page with an audio sample of Natula averni

Insects described in 1855
Trigonidiinae
Orthoptera of Europe